The 2013 Charleston Southern Buccaneers football team represented Charleston Southern University as a member of the Big South Conference during the 2013 NCAA Division I FCS football season. Led by first-year head coach Jamey Chadwell, the Buccaneers compiled an overall record of 10–3 with a mark of 3–2 in conference play, placing third in the Big South. Charleston Southern played home games at Buccaneer Field in Charleston, South Carolina.

Schedule

Game summaries

@ The Citadel

Shorter

@ Campbell

@ Norfolk State

@ Appalachian State

North Greenville

@ VMI

@ Colorado

Colorado's game vs Fresno State on September 14 was cancelled due to flooding, making Colorado need to add a 12th game. On September 30, Charleston Southern was granted a waiver to play a 13th regular season game to be able to play Colorado.

Charlotte

@ Presbyterian

Coastal Carolina

@ Gardner–Webb

Liberty

Ranking movements

References

Charleston Southern
Charleston Southern Buccaneers football seasons
Charleston Southern Buccaneers football